Frank Broadstreet Carvell,  (14 August 1862 – 9 August 1924) was a Canadian lawyer, businessman, and politician.

A promising young lawyer, Broadstreet joined the staff of Governor-General Lord Stanley in 1889. He later served as Canada's first justice of the peace. Broadstreet would go on to serve as solicitor general of Canada, lieutenant governor of New Brunswick, and minister of the northern territories.

Carvell was born in Woodstock, New Brunswick. His father was a farmer descended from United Empire Loyalists and his mother was an Ulster Protestant. He was educated locally and worked as a teacher. In 1890 he earned his law degree from Boston University and returned to Woodstock to practice law. He was elected to the county council and became involved in business with stock in the Woodstock Power Company and the Carleton Electric Company.

He purchased the Carleton Sentinel, a Liberal newspaper and was also the main shareholder for a time of the Carleton Observer.

In 1899 he was elected to the Legislative Assembly of New Brunswick but resigned a year later to contest the federal seat of Carleton but lost by 255 votes to Conservative Frederick Harding Hale, a lumber merchant.

He won the seat on his next attempt and was the Liberal member of the House of Commons of Canada for the New Brunswick riding from 1904 until 1917. He was a minor backbencher in the Liberal caucus and was passed over for appointment to Sir Wilfrid Laurier's Cabinet in favour of William Pugsley when a New Brunswick seat at the Cabinet table opened up due to the resignation of Henry Emmerson. Carvell was offered a seat on the Supreme Court of New Brunswick in 1909 but turned it down.

The Liberal government was defeated in the 1911 federal election and Carvell moved to the Opposition bench where he became prominent as a critic of Sam Hughes, Borden's Militia Minister. He also became active in provincial politics, joining party organizers Peter Veniot and Edward S. Carter as leading members of a powerful group of back-room Liberals known as the "Dark Lantern Brigade" who accused the provincial Conservative government of James Kidd Flemming of receiving kickbacks from the timber industry. The New Brunswick Liberal Association offered Carvell the leadership of the provincial party but he declined at Laurier's urging.

Despite his criticism of the Borden government's prosecution of the war as well as its nationalization of Canadian Northern Railway, Carvell broke with Laurier over the issue of conscription opposing Laurier's call for a referendum on the question. Carvell was approached by Borden to cross the floor during the Conscription Crisis and join his government but Carvell initially refused only to change his mind and join the government of Sir Robert Borden on October 17, 1917 as Minister of Public Works in the new Union government. He was re-elected in the 1917 federal election as a Liberal-Unionist MP for Victoria—Carleton by acclamation.

Following the war Carvell wished to rejoin the Liberals but was rejected by his former party.  Instead, he retired from politics in 1919 upon being appointed Chairman of the Board of Railway Commissioners.

Electoral record

Further reading
 Arthur T. Doyle, Front Benches and Back Rooms: A story of corruption, muckraking, raw partisanship and political intrigue in New Brunswick, Toronto: Green Tree Publishing, 1976.

References

External links
 

1862 births
1924 deaths
Canadian schoolteachers
Boston University School of Law alumni
Canadian lawyers
New Brunswick Liberal Association MLAs
Liberal Party of Canada MPs
Liberal-Unionist MPs in Canada
Members of the House of Commons of Canada from New Brunswick
Members of the King's Privy Council for Canada
People from Woodstock, New Brunswick
New Brunswick municipal councillors